Massimiliano Gentili (born 16 September 1971 in Foligno) is an Italian former road cyclist.

Major results

1992
 2nd Coppa della Pace
1994
 5th GP Capodarco
1995
 1st Giro del Casentino
 1st Gran Premio Inda
 4th Gran Premio della Liberazione
 5th Overall Tour de Slovénie
1996
 1st Stage 5 Vuelta a Asturias
 1st Stage 11 Volta a Portugal
 4th Overall Volta a Catalunya
 8th Giro dell'Appennino
 9th Overall Giro del Trentino
1997
 4th Overall Tirreno–Adriatico
1998
 5th Coppa Agostoni
 6th Züri-Metzgete
 10th Overall Volta a la Comunitat Valenciana
1999
 10th GP Industria & Artigianato
2000
 4th Trofeo dello Scalatore
 8th GP Industria & Commercio di Prato
 9th Overall Vuelta a España
2001
 8th Giro del Veneto
 8th GP Industria & Artigianato
2002
 4th Züri-Metzgete
 5th Subida al Naranco
 6th GP Città di Camaiore
 8th Giro del Veneto
 10th Overall Tour de l'Ain
2003
 5th Giro del Veneto
2004
 3rd Overall Brixia Tour
 4th Overall Bayern-Rundfahrt
1st Stage 4
 7th Coppa Agostoni
 7th Giro di Toscana
 8th GP Industria & Artigianato
 8th GP Città di Camaiore
 9th Trofeo Laigueglia
 10th Züri-Metzgete
2005
 5th Trofeo Matteotti
 8th GP Fred Mengoni
 9th Giro di Lombardia
 9th Stausee-Rundfahrt Klingnau
 10th Overall Euskal Bizikleta
1st Stage 6
2006
 8th GP Fred Mengoni
 10th Overall Brixia Tour
2008
 6th Overall Giro della Provincia di reggio Calabria
 7th Overall Euskal Bizikleta
2009
 8th Overall Settimana Ciclistica Lombarda
 8th Overall Route du Sud
 9th Trofeo Melinda
2010
 7th GP Industria & Artigianato

Grand Tour general classification results timeline

References

1971 births
Living people
Italian male cyclists
People from Foligno
Sportspeople from the Province of Perugia
Cyclists from Umbria